Paul W. Murrill (July 10, 1934,  St. Louis, Missouri  – April 2, 2018) was an American academic administrator and businessman. He was the chancellor of Louisiana State University from 1974 to 1981.

References

1934 births
2018 deaths
People from St. Louis
University of Mississippi alumni
Louisiana State University alumni
American academic administrators